The Jersey Dragons were a soccer club that competed in the United Soccer Leagues from 1994 to 1996. The club was based in Hoboken, New Jersey.

Year-by-year

Defunct soccer clubs in New Jersey
USISL teams
Soccer clubs in New Jersey
Defunct indoor soccer clubs in the United States
1994 establishments in New Jersey
1996 disestablishments in New Jersey
Association football clubs established in 1994
Association football clubs disestablished in 1996